The Ringette World Club Championship (RWCC) was an international ringette competition organized by the International Ringette Federation (IRF). It featured the top teams from Canada's National Ringette League (NRL), Finland's , and Sweden's Ringette Dam-SM. The World Club Championship was only held twice, the first time in 2008 and the last time in 2011.

In 2013 the IRF cancelled the 2014 Championship which was planned to be organized in Sweden. After the original two international tournaments, the club competition was discontinued due to financial difficulties preventing teams from participating.

Clubs 
Competing clubs came from Finland, Canada, and Sweden.

Results (2008–2014)

2008 Ringette World Club Championship
The First World Championship of Ringette Clubs took place in Sault Ste. Marie, Ontario, Canada and began on November 5, 2008. The tournament was hosted by the Cambridge Turbos. The first game took place at the Essar Centre, an ice hockey arena now called GFL Memorial Gardens.

The international competition involved six of the world's best ringette clubs: four teams from the elite Canadian National Ringette League (NRL) and two teams from the elite Finnish ringette league, Ringeten SM-Sarja, participated. The teams from the NRL included the Cambridge Turbos, Montreal Mission, Calgary RATH, and the Richmond Hill Lightning.

Venue

Results
Results for the 2008 Ringette World Club Championship were as follows: 

  Gold: Cambridge Turbos
 (5 games) 5 wins
  Silver: (LuKi-82)
 (5 games) 3 wins | 2 losses
  Bronze: Calgary RATH,
 2 wins | 2 lost

 4th:  (EKS-Espoo)
 (4 games) 1 win 
 5th: Montreal Mission
 (4 games) 1 win
 6th: Richmond Hill Lightning

2011 Ringette World Club Championship

The second and final Ringette World Club Championships were held at the Kupittaa Ice Arena in Turku, Finland from Tuesday, December 27, 2011 to Sunday, January 1, 2012. Canada was represented by two teams: the Richmond Hill Lightning and the world champion of ringette clubs, the Cambridge Turbos. The Swedish club, Ulriksdals SK Ringette, also participated in the international tournament.

In the semi-final, LL -89 overcame the Cambridge Turbos, 3–1. The Championship Finale consisted entirely of Finnish clubs where team LL -89 went up against the RNK Flyers for gold medal. LL -89 beat the RNK Flyers, 5–4, to win the golden medal. Tiina Randell scored the winning goals.

Venue

Results
Results for the 2011 Ringette World Club Championship were as follows:

  Gold:  LL -89
  Silver:  RNK Flyers
  Bronze:  LuKi-82

 4th: Cambridge Turbos
 5th: Richmond Hill Lightning
 6th: Ulriksdals SK Ringette

2014 Ringette World Club Championship

In 2013 the International Ringette Federation (IRF) cancelled the 2014 Ringette World Club Championship which initially had been planned to be organized in Sweden.

References

External links 

Ringette
Ringette competitions
Ringette, Club
Women's sports competitions
Recurring sporting events established in 2008
Multi-national professional sports leagues